Emiliano Díez (born August 26, 1953) is a Cuban-American actor. He is best known for his role as Dr. Vic Palmero, George's father-in-law, in the sitcom George Lopez, as well as his role as Manny Beltrán in the sitcom Los Beltrán.

Early life
Díez began his acting career in 1976 in theatre and television. In 1980 at the age of 26, he immigrated to Miami to extend his career by doing numerous popular plays like Blithe Spirit, La Cage Aux Folles, The Rose Tattoo and many others.

Career
Díez also appeared in radio and television commercials, as well as the soap operas El Magnate, Marielena, Guadalupe and for two seasons he was cast for the leading role playing Manny Beltrán in the award-winning sitcom, Los Beltrán.

He later crossed over doing American films and television guest starring in Everybody Loves Raymond, Yes, Dear, MDs, Manhattan, AZ, The Brothers Mamita and a recurring role for nine episodes in the daytime drama Passions. He also appeared on seaQuest DSV, Fortune Hunter, Sins of the City, Nostromo, Gang Related as El Mozo, Bates Motel as Alex's dad, and co-starred on George Lopez as Dr. Victor Palmero, Angie's father. His film credits include Sudden Terror: The Hijacking of School Bus #17, Water, Mud and Factories, The Last Straw and Cafe and Beer. He appeared in Adventures in Babysitting as Leon Vasquez. He also voiced Francisco in the computer-animated television series, Elena of Avalor.

Filmography

Film

Television

See also

List of Cubans

References

External links

Cuban male film actors
Cuban male television actors
Cuban male stage actors
Living people
Cuban emigrants to the United States
American male film actors
American male television actors
1953 births